The men's 81 kg competition of the judo events at the 2011 Pan American Games in Guadalajara, Mexico, was held on October 27 at the CODE II Gymanasium.  The defending champion was Travis Stevens of the United States.

Schedule
All times are Central Standard Time (UTC-6).

Results
Legend

1st number = Ippon
2nd number = Waza-ari
3rd number = Yuko

Bracket

Repechage round
Two bronze medals were awarded.

References

M81
Judo at the Pan American Games Men's Half Middleweight